St James' Independent Schools in London (UK) are three fee-paying schools for children aged 4 to 18. The Junior and Senior Girls' Schools are in the London Borough of Hammersmith and Fulham, and the Senior Boys' School in Ashford, Surrey.

In 2019 The Times UK School Guide ranked St James' Senior Girls School 102nd with 82.1% scoring A*-B at A-Level, and St James' Senior Boys 251st with 75.9% scoring A*- B at A-level.

Meditation and Mindfulness 
St James' incorporate stillness, meditation, reflection techniques into the school routine.

Sanskrit Language 
Unusually for a UK school, the St James Schools teach Sanskrit.，which is a compulsory second language for the junior students. Being an ancient Indo-European language its study illuminates the grammar and etymology of modern languages of that family, including English; its philosophical concepts provide a wealth of human thought; regarded classical language par excellence and considered positive while assessing university admissions. It also helps students grasp maths, science and other languages better. Warwick Jessup, head of Sanskrit department, says: "This is the most perfect and logical language in the world, the only one that is not named after the people who speak it. Indeed the word 'Sanskrit' itself means perfected language." Paul Moss, Headmaster of the school, says: "The Devanagri script and spoken Sanskrit are two of the best ways for a child to overcome stiffness of fingers and the tongue. Today’s European languages do not use many parts of the tongue and mouth while speaking or many finger movements while writing, whereas Sanskrit helps immensely to develop cerebral dexterity through its phonetics."

Students of St. James chanted Vedic hymns in presence of Queen Elizabeth at the Buckingham Palace in 2010 to celebrate beginning of the Commonwealth Games.

Connection with the School of Economic Science

The School of Economic Science, through associated overseas schools, supports independent children's schools in a number of countries, including Australia, New Zealand, Ireland (John Scottus School), the West Indies and the United States.

The St James' Schools are legally independent from the School of Economic Science. They seek to preserve the ethos of their founding philosophical principles which are derived from the Advaita Vedanta philosophical tradition, which the schools describe as encompassing the concept of unity, and of a multicultural approach which embraces all faiths – and no faith. Philosophy is taught and transcendental meditation is an optional practice in the schools.

The Education Renaissance Trust, a UK registered charity, was founded by the SES in 1998 with the aim of "[making their] philosophy of education based on spiritual values available more widely". The ERT provides support and funding for the St James schools worldwide, and currently runs inset training days for teachers in UK state schools.

Today, only around 10 per cent of the children have parents involved with SES.

Criticisms
In the early 1980s the London Evening Standard ran a critical series of articles focusing on the School's discipline regime and its links to the School of Economic Science.

An independent inquiry into mistreatment of pupils between 1975 and 1985 at St James' and its then sister school St Vedast's, which closed in 1985, was funded by the schools and chaired by James Townend QC. The report, published in January 2006, concluded that "mental and physical mistreatment" of some pupils had occurred, including "criminal assaults" by teachers, during the ten-year period considered by the inquiry. Townend's report also found that throughout this period the schools' management and governors were failing to the extent that they "were not in any real sense in charge of the Schools".

In his conclusion, Townend stated that there had been "a real change of ethos and conduct of the schools" since the period of abuses he identified in his report.

In December 2020 a BBC News report stated that nearly £1m in compensation had been paid to dozens of former students at St James and St Vedast schools following historical allegations of abuse.

Following the legal action, which was launched against the school in 2016, the BBC reported 45 former students who attended the schools between 1975 and 1992 had so far received payments of up to £30,000 each. All of the cases were settled without an admission of liability and did not come before court.

Former schools 
St Vedast's School for Boys, at Sarum Chase in West Heath Road, Hampstead, London, was sold in January 2005 for £9,300,000. The building is now a private residence.

Notable former pupils

Notable former pupils include:

 Clara Salaman, actress, The Bill
 Emily Watson, actress, star of Breaking the Waves and Appropriate Adult

References

External links
 St James Independent Schools Website
 School of Economic Science website 
 Education Renaissance trust
 The Parents & Pupils Inquiry Action Group

Private boys' schools in London
Private girls' schools in London
Private schools in the London Borough of Hammersmith and Fulham
Private schools in Surrey
Member schools of the Girls' Schools Association